This is a list of diseases starting with a digit.

1–3
10q partial trisomy
11 beta hydroxylase deficiency
11 beta hydroxysteroid dehydrogenase type 2 deficiency
17 alpha hydroxylase deficiency
17 beta hydroxysteroide dehydrogenase deficiency
17-beta-hydroxysteroid dehydrogenase deficiency, rare (NIH)
17q21.31 microdeletion syndrome
18-Hydroxylase deficiency, rare (NIH) 
18p deletion syndrome
1p36 deletion syndrome, rare (NIH)
2-hydroxyethyl methacrylate sensitization, rare (NIH)
2-hydroxyglutaricaciduria
2-Hydroxyglutaricaciduria, rare (NIH)
2-Methylacetoacetyl CoA thiolase deficiency, rare (NIH)
2,8 dihydroxy-adenine urolithiasis
21 hydroxylase deficiency
22q11.2 deletion syndrome, rare (NIH) 
3 alpha methylcrotonyl-Coa carboxylase 1 deficiency, rare (NIH)
3 alpha methylcrotonyl-coa carboxylase 2 deficiency, rare (NIH)
3 alpha methylglutaconic aciduria, type 3, rare (NIH)
3 beta hydroxysteroid dehydrogenase deficiency
3 hydroxyisobutyric aciduria
3 hydroxyisobutyric aciduria, rare (NIH) 
3 methylcrotonic aciduria
3 methylglutaconyl coa hydratase deficiency
3-hydroxy 3-methyl glutaryl-coa lyase deficiency
3-hydroxyacyl-coa dehydrogenase deficiency
3-M syndrome, rare (NIH)
3-methyl crotonyl-coa carboxylase deficiency
3-methyl glutaconic aciduria
3C syndrome, rare (NIH)
3q29 microdeletion syndrome

4–9
4-Alpha-hydroxyphenylpyruvate hydroxylase deficiency, rare (NIH)
4-hydroxyphenylacetic aciduria, rare (NIH), optic atrophy
46 xx gonadal dysgenesis epibulbar dermoid, rare (NIH)
47, XXY syndrome
47, XYY syndrome
47, XXX syndrome
48, XXXX syndrome
48, XXYY syndrome
49, XXXXX syndrome
49, XXXXY syndrome
5 alpha reductase 2 deficiency
5-alpha-Oxoprolinase deficiency, rare (NIH)
5-Nucleotidase syndrome, rare (NIH)
5p minus syndrome
5q- syndrome
6 alpha mercaptopurine sensitivity, rare (NIH)
6-pyruvoyl-tetrahydropterin synthase deficiency, rare (NIH)
6-pyruvoyltetrahydropterin synthase deficiency
7-dehydrocholesterol reductase deficiency
8p23.1 duplication syndrome
9q34 deletion syndrome

References